Guillaume Chastillon de la Tour (fl. 1550-1610) was a French composer of airs de cour and chansons. He published three books of airs in 1590 at Caen.

References

French Baroque composers
French male classical composers
16th-century French people
17th-century male musicians